Matt Weston  (born Redhill, Surrey, England) is a British skeleton racer who represents the United Kingdom in the Men's Singles event in the Skeleton World Cup. During January 2023, Weston became the first British male since Kristan Bromley to win the European or World Title in skelton. In the same season, Weston won five Skeleton World Cup races. His coach from the 2023 season was Latvian skelton legend Martins Dukurs. 

His best-placed overall ranking to date is 2nd in the 2022–23 Skeleton World Cup. He competed for Great Britain at the 2022 Winter Olympics in the men's skeleton, finishing in 15th place.

In November 2021, he claimed Great Britain's first World Cup win in almost 14 years after a three-way tie for gold in Igls.

Career results

Olympic Games

World Championships

Skeleton World Cup
Source:

References

External links

1997 births
Living people
English male skeleton racers
Olympic skeleton racers of Great Britain
Skeleton racers at the 2022 Winter Olympics
Sportspeople from Surrey